Coumaric acid is a phenolic derivative of cinnamic acid having a hydroxy group as substituent at one of the aromatic positions:

 o-Coumaric acid
 m-Coumaric acid
 p-Coumaric acid